Yakuza Princess is a Brazilian action thriller film directed by Vicente Amorim, with an screenplay by Amorim, Fernando Toste, Kimi Lee and Tubaldini Shelling, based on the graphic novel Samurai Shiro by Danilo Beyruth. The film stars Masumi, Jonathan Rhys Meyers, Tsuyoshi Ihara, Eijiro Ozaki, and Kenny Leu.

Cast
 Masumi as Akemi
Jonathan Rhys Meyers as Shiro
 Tsuyoshi Ihara as Takeshi
Eijiro Ozaki as Kojiro
 Kenny Leu as The Taxi Driver
 Mariko Takai as Mrs. Tsugahara
 Charles Paraventi as Armond
 Toshiji Takeshima as Chiba
 Lucas Oranmian as Perito

Production
In October 2019, it was announced that the singer Masumi will make her big screen debut opposite Jonathan Rhys Meyers in the action film that completed filming in Brazil. On February 10, 2021, it was reported that XYZ Films would sell worldwide rights save Latin America, in the European Film Market, in early March. On April 6, 2021 it was announced that Magnet Releasing has acquired the U.S distribution rights.

References

External links
 
 
 

2021 films
Brazilian action thriller films
Films based on Brazilian comics
Martial arts films
Live-action films based on comics
2020s English-language films
English-language Brazilian films
Yakuza films